Austrogomphus australis, also known as Austrogomphus (Austrogomphus) australis, is a species of dragonfly of the family Gomphidae, 
commonly known as the inland hunter. 
It is widespread and common, inhabiting rivers and pools in inland eastern Australia.

Austrogomphus australis is a tiny to medium-sized, black and yellow dragonfly.

Gallery

See also
 List of Odonata species of Australia

References

Gomphidae
Odonata of Australia
Insects of Australia
Endemic fauna of Australia
Taxa named by James Charles Dale
Insects described in 1854